is the fifth single by Japanese singer Yōko Oginome. Written by Gorō Matsui and Hideya Nakazaki, the single was released on May 21, 1985 by Victor Entertainment.

Background and release
The song was used by Kao Corporation for their Biore U skincare commercial shot in Guam and featuring Oginome. It was also featured in the Fuji TV drama special , which also starred Oginome. Following its release, "Koishite Caribbean" was used as a sports cheering theme by Saitama Seibu Lions player Koji Akiyama, Cerezo Osaka player Hiroaki Morishima, Urawa Red Diamonds player Kenji Oshiba, and Omiya Ardija player Ariajasuru Hasegawa.

The B-side, "Ai no Time Capsule", was the image song of the 60th anniversary of NHK Osaka.

"Koishite Caribbean" peaked at No. 24 on Oricon's singles chart and sold over 66,000 copies.

Oginome re-recorded the song with a synth-pop arrangement for her 1987 greatest hits album Pop Groover: The Best.

Track listing

Charts

References

External links

1985 singles
Yōko Oginome songs
Japanese-language songs
Songs with lyrics by Gorō Matsui
Victor Entertainment singles